Venus Williams was the defending champion, but chose not to participate that year.

Unseeded Justine Henin-Hardenne won the title, defeating Svetlana Kuznetsova in the final, 3–6, 6–2, 7–5.

Seeds

Draw

Finals

Top half

Bottom half

External links
Draw and Qualifying Draw

JandS Cup - Singles